In Christianity, the concept of an Apostolic Throne refers to one of the historic Patriarchates that was associated with a specific apostle. Not all of the apostles are associated with specific "thrones"; in general, the phrase applies to Apostles that presided over a specific geographic church. Notably, there is no apostolic throne associated with St. Paul, who along with St. Peter was present, at different times, in both Antioch and Rome (where both Peter and Paul were crucified. The phrase is also somewhat interchangeable with the "Apostolic See".

Apostolic thrones
Saint James the Just is associated with the Apostolic Throne of Jerusalem. 
Both the Roman Catholic Pope and the Patriarchs of Antioch consider themselves as occupying the Apostolic Throne of St. Peter, as Peter presided over the early church from those locations.
The Roman Catholic Pope resides on the Apostolic Throne of St. Peter in Rome
Eastern churches reside on the Apostolic Throne of St. Peter in Antioch. These includes the patriarchs of the Syriac Orthodox Church, the Greek Orthodox Church of Antioch, the Syriac Catholic Church, the Melkite Greek Catholic Church, and the Maronite Church. Historically, there has also been a Latin patriarch of Antioch.
The Coptic and Greek Orthodox Patriarch of Alexandria (also known as the Pope of Alexandria) consider themselves as occupying the throne of St. Mark the Evangelist, who founded the Alexandrian church. 
The Catholicos of All Armenians of the Armenian Apostolic Church and consequently also the Armenian Catholicos of the Great House of Cilicia (Holy See of Cilicia) and the Patriarchate of Cilicia of the Armenian Catholic Church all consider themselves as occupying the throne of both St. Jude the Apostle (also known as St. Thaddaeus) and St. Bartholomew. 
The historical Church of the East and consequently the Catholicos of Assyrian Church of the East and very recently the Patriarch of the Ancient Church of the East consider themselves also as successors of St.Thomas, a view also held by Syriac Orthodox, the Maphrian.
Catholicos of the East and Malankara Metropolitan of the Malankara Orthodox Syrian church is occupying the Apostolic Throne of St. Thomas.
Saint John was himself associated with the apostolic throne of Ephesus, although this Apostolic See has been canonically vacant since 1922.

Other thrones
The See of Milan claimed the Apostle Barnabas as its founder, but this was disputed.  Nonetheless, this Apostolic Throne was later occupied by the highly important Bishop St. Ambrose, who was the mentor of St. Augustine of Hippo (not to be confused with St. Augustine of Canterbury) presided over the See of Milan, which follows a distinctive rite, the Ambrosian Rite, with a liturgy somewhat different from that of Latin Rite Catholicism.

The Archbishop of Canterbury is crowned atop St. Augustine's Chair, referring to the first holder of that office, St. Augustine of Canterbury, not to be confused with the earlier theologian St. Augustine of Hippo.

See also
Patriarchate
Episcopal See

References

Patriarchy